A close vowel, also known as a high vowel (in U.S. terminology), is any in a class of vowel sounds used in many spoken languages. The defining characteristic of a close vowel is that the tongue is positioned as close as possible to the roof of the mouth as it can be without creating a constriction. A constriction would produce a sound that would be classified as a consonant.

The term "close"  is recommended by the International Phonetic Association. Close vowels are often referred to as "high" vowels, as in the Americanist phonetic tradition, because the tongue is positioned high in the mouth during articulation.

In the context of the phonology of any particular language, a high vowel can be any vowel that is more close than a mid vowel. That is, close-mid vowels, near-close vowels, and close vowels can all be considered high vowels.

Partial list
The six close vowels that have dedicated symbols in the International Phonetic Alphabet are:

 close front unrounded vowel 
 close front compressed vowel 
 close central unrounded vowel 
 close central protruded vowel 
 close back unrounded vowel 
 close back protruded vowel 

(IPA letters for rounded vowels are ambiguous as to whether the rounding is protrusion or compression. However, transcription of the world's languages tends to pattern as above.)

There also are close vowels that don't have dedicated symbols in the IPA:
 close front protruded vowel 
 close central compressed vowel 
 close back compressed vowel 

See also
 Open vowel

References 

Vowels by height